The 1942–43 season was the fourth year of wartime football by the Rangers.

Results
All results are written below, with Rangers' score first.

Southern League

Southern League Cup

Summer Cup

See also
 1942–43 in Scottish football
 1942–43 Southern League Cup (Scotland)

Rangers F.C. seasons
Rangers
Scottish football championship-winning seasons